Bear Creek Township is a township in Hamilton County, Kansas, USA.  As of the 2000 census, its population was 69.

Geography
According to the USGS, it contains two cemeteries: Bear Creek and Sunnyvale.

The streams of Dry Creek and North Bear Creek run through this township.

References
 USGS Geographic Names Information System (GNIS)

External links
 US-Counties.com
 City-Data.com

Townships in Hamilton County, Kansas
Townships in Kansas